Abortion in the United States Virgin Islands is legal on request up to 24 weeks of pregnancy, and afterwards only in cases that endanger the life or health of the mother. There are five clinics in the territory. Women travel from the British Virgin Islands for abortions because it is illegal there.

Legal status 
Abortion is allowed in the United States Virgin Islands on request up to 24 weeks of pregnancy, and afterwards only in cases that endanger the life or health of the mother. Abortion may only be performed by a licensed physician, and after 12 weeks of pregnancy only by a surgeon or gynecologist at a hospital.

Abortion clinics 
, there are five abortion clinics in the U.S. Virgin Islands. One is in St. Thomas, one in St. Croix and three are in St. John.

History 
Women from the British Virgin Islands who want an abortion were traveling to St. Thomas in the U.S. Virgin Islands in 2016 to get an abortion because abortion is illegal in the British Virgin Islands. Pregnant women in the U.S. Virgin Islands were at risk of getting the Zika virus, which causes major fetal defects. These defects can be so severe that health care professionals recommend termination of the pregnancy.

Contraceptives 
As of 1994, the U.S. Virgin Islands included family planning services as part of their Medicaid program. These services included contraceptive services and supplies, and sterilizations.

References 

Politics of the United States Virgin Islands
Society of the United States Virgin Islands
United States Virgin Islands
United States Virgin Islands
Health in the United States Virgin Islands
Women in the United States Virgin Islands